The Temple of Hercules Victor ('Hercules the Winner') or Hercules Olivarius ((Hercules the Olive Branch Bearear) is a Roman temple in Piazza Bocca della Verità in the area of the Forum Boarium near the Tiber in Rome.  It is a tholos, a round temple of Greek 'peripteral' design completely surrounded by a colonnade. This layout caused it to be mistaken for a temple of Vesta until it was correctly identified by Napoleon's Prefect of Rome, Camille de Tournon. 

Despite (or perhaps due to) the Forum Boarium's role as the cattle-market for ancient Rome, the Temple of Hercules is the subject of a folk belief claiming that neither flies nor dogs will enter the holy place. The temple is the earliest surviving marble building in Rome. The Hercules Temple of Victor is also the only surviving sacred temple in ancient Rome that is made of Greek marble.

Description

These elements supported an architrave and roof, which have disappeared.

The original wall of the cella, built of travertine and marble blocks, and nineteen of the originally twenty columns remain but the current tile roof was added later. Palladio's published reconstruction suggested a dome, though this was apparently erroneous. The temple is the earliest surviving marble building in Rome. The temple's original dedication is dated back to circa 143-132 BC, a time when intense construction was taking place in Portus Tiberinus.

Identification

Its major literary sources are two almost identical passages, one in Servius' commentary on the Aeneid (viii.363) and the other in Macrobius' Saturnalia. Though Servius mentions that aedes duae sunt, "there are two sacred temples", the earliest Roman calendars mention but one festival, on 13 August, to Hercules Victor and Hercules Invictus interchangeably.

Post-Classical history

In the 1st century AD, the temple was hit with some sort of disaster as 10 columns were replaced with Luna marble, which is similar to the original but not an exact replica. By 1132, the temple had been converted to a church, known as Santo Stefano alle Carozze (St. Stephen 'of the carriages'). In 1140, Innocent II converted the temple into a Christian church dedicating it to Santo Stefano. 

Additional restorations (and a fresco over the altar) were made in 1475. A plaque in the floor was dedicated by Sixtus IV. In the 12th century, the cella wall was replaced with brick faced concrete and windows were added as well. 

In the 17th century, the church was rededicated to Santa Maria del Sole ("St. Mary of the Sun"). The temple and the Temple of Vesta in Tivoli were an inspiration for Bramante's Tempietto and other High Renaissance churches of centralized plan. Between 1809 and 1810, the surrounding ground level was lowered and the temple was restored once again. The temple was recognized officially as an ancient monument in 1935 and restored in 1996.

See also

List of Ancient Roman temples

References

Sources 
 Alberti, Leone Battista. Architecture, 1755, tr. Leoni, James.
 Claridge, Amanda. Oxford Archaeological Guides - Rome. Oxford University Press, 1998
 Coarelli, Filippo. Guida Archeologica di Roma. Arnoldo Mondadori Editore, Milano, 1989.
 
 Woodward, Christopher. The Buildings of Europe - Rome. page 30, Manchester University Press, 1995. 
 
Loar, Matthew Hercules, Mummius, and the Roman Triumph in Aeneid 8.” Classical Philology, www.journals.uchicago.edu/doi/10.1086/689726.

External links
Detailed photographs of the interior and features of the building
High-resolution 360° Panoramas and Images of Temple of Hercules | Art Atlas

2nd-century BC religious buildings and structures
2nd-century BC establishments in the Roman Republic
Hercules
Temples of Heracles
Conversion of non-Christian religious buildings and structures into churches
Deconsecrated Roman Catholic churches in Rome
Rome R. XII Ripa
Hercules